Domico Coddington (born May 24, 1984) is a Bermudian football player, who currently plays for local side Devonshire Cougars.

Career

Club
Coddington began his career with Devonshire Cougars, and played for the team for four years in the Bermudian Premier Division before joining the Bermuda Hogges in the USL Second Division in 2007. He had earlier had spells in Canada with Durham Storm and Oakville Blue Devils.

International
He made his debut for Bermuda in a December 2003 friendly match against Barbados and earned a total of 26 caps, scoring 2 goals. He has represented his country in 5 FIFA World Cup qualification matches. He played in one of Bermuda's qualifying games for the 2006 FIFA World Cup, and in two of Bermuda's qualifying games for the 2010 FIFA World Cup, including their 1-1 tiw with the Cayman Islands on February 3, 2008.

His final international match was a September 2012 Caribbean Cup match against Saint Martin.

International goals
Scores and results list Bermuda's goal tally first.

References

External links

1984 births
Living people
Association football midfielders
Bermudian footballers
Bermuda international footballers
Brampton United players
Bermuda Hogges F.C. players
USL Second Division players
USL League Two players
Bermudian expatriate footballers
Expatriate soccer players in Canada
Canadian Soccer League (1998–present) players